President Theodore Roosevelt High School is a public, co-educational college preparatory high school in Honolulu, Hawai'i. It is operated by the Hawaii State Department of Education and serves grades nine through 12. Roosevelt High School is accredited by the Western Association of Schools and Colleges. Roosevelt was ranked as the top high school in Hawaii in 2019 by U.S. News & World Report (see State and National Ranking, below).

History

President Theodore Roosevelt High School is one of the oldest public secondary schools in the state of Hawaii. It was one of the first schools in the state to have compulsory Reserve Officer Training Corps education, a standard from 1934 to 1966.

The school avoided destruction when on March 4, 1942, the Imperial Japanese Navy attempted to bomb Pearl Harbor a second time. Weather caused one of the two floatplane bombers to drop its bombs 980 feet from the school, shattering some windows.

Roosevelt High School is most famous for its buildings and landmark domed bell tower constructed in Spanish mission architectural style, currently being restored through grants of the Hawaii State Legislature. Its buildings were used as backdrops in several movie and television productions. Adjacent to the historic bell-towered building is the 2001 Hawaiian basalt sculpture "Hookahi" (To Make as One), by Mark Watson.

Shooting 
In January 2014, a police officer shot a knife-wielding runaway teen who was being detained for trespassing and became disruptive at the school.

Campus and location
Roosevelt High School is located in urban Honolulu, Hawaii. It is situated in Makiki's Kalāwahine Valley adjacent to the National Memorial Cemetery of the Pacific overlooking downtown Honolulu and Ala Moana.

Demographics

There were 1427 students attending Roosevelt High School in the 2012-2013 school year. As of then, the racial composition was as follows:

 White: 5.2%
 Black: 1.0%
 Hispanic: 2.2%
 Asian/Pacific Islander: 84.2%
 American Indian: 0.4%
 Multiracial: 7.0%

Complex Area Information
Roosevelt High School is part of the Hawaii Department of Education Kaimuki-McKinley-Roosevelt Complex Area along with Kaimuki High School and McKinley High School.

Roosevelt Complex
The Roosevelt Complex consists of 12 elementary, middle, and public charter schools including Roosevelt.

Anuenue School
Education Lab Public Charter School
Halau Ku Mana Public Charter School
Kawananakoa Middle School
Lincoln Elementary School
Maemae Elementary School
Manoa Elementary School
Noelani Elementary School
Nuuanu Elementary School
Pauoa Elementary School
Stevenson Middle School

Feeder Middle Schools
Roosevelt High School feeds primarily from 3 middle schools in the Honolulu area.

Prince David Kawananakoa Middle School
Robert Louis Stevenson Middle School
President George Washington Middle School

Programs

Music

The Roosevelt High School Music Department consists of Band (Concert/Symphonic), Orchestra (Concert/Symphony), Marching band, Jazz Ensemble.

The orchestra program consists of the Chamber Strings and the Symphony Orchestra.

Smaller Learning Communities

Academies
List of academies include:
 Arts and Communication Academy,
 Engineering and Technology Academy,
 Liberal Arts Academy,
 Sports & Fitness Academy

Arts and Communication Academy
Roosevelt's Arts and Communication Academy officially began operations in 2002 and in 2004 graduated its first class. Known for involving language, art, humanities, and history in a humanistic approach, the academy is active with the Hawaii Opera Theater and brings students to cultural centers such as Paris, Barcelona, and Madrid. Recently they are also expanding their school trips to Asia, particularly Japan. This academy is usually in charge of hosting Japanese students on their visits to Hawaii to study how schools there operate.

Notable alumni
 Alfred Apaka, singer, bassist
 Yvonne Elliman, singer
 James Shigeta, actor
 Thomas Gill, Congressman
 Ivanelle Hoe, swimmer
 Bruno Mars, singer, song writer, and producer
 Chad Owens, Canadian Football League player
 Clarissa Chun, 2x US Olympian, wrestler
 Larry Price, radio talk show host
 William S. Richardson, Chief Justice of Hawaii
 Dietrich Varez, artist, printmaker
 Mike Lum, former professional baseball player (Atlanta Braves, Cincinnati Reds, and Chicago Cubs)  
 Gervin Miyamoto, United States Marshal for the District of Hawaii
 John Simerson, American football player
 Sammy Steamboat, professional wrestler
 Peter Moon, ukulele and slack-key guitar player

State and National Ranking
Roosevelt received a "Best High School" ranking in 2019 from U.S. News & World Report with a score of 97.91, making it the top high school in Hawaii and ranking #360 nationally out of 17,245 ranked schools.

References

External links

Public high schools in Honolulu
1932 establishments in Hawaii
Educational institutions established in 1932
Hawaii in World War II